Spring is the debut single album by the South Korean singer Park Bom released on March 13, 2019, by D-Nation. "Spring" was released as the lead single from the EP on March 13, 2019, alongside the premiere of its music video. The song was produced by Brave Brothers and was described as an "R&B song of medium tempo". Additionally, "Spring" features vocals from Park's former groupmate Dara.  Spring was re-released as an extended play titled re:Blue Rose on May 2, 2019. The lead single titled "4:44" was produced by the Brave Brothers once again and featured vocals from Wheein.

Live performances
The title song  was performed for the first time during Spring's showcase event, which was held on the same day of its release.

Commercial performance
"Spring" debuted at number two on Billboard's World Digital Song Sales chart as highest-selling K-pop song and highest-charting new entry of that week.

Track listing
Credits adapted from Tidal.

Charts

Singles

"Spring"

Year-end charts

"4:44"

Awards and nominations

References

2019 EPs
Korean-language EPs
Single albums